James Edwin Barnden (23 June 1926 – 29 December 1986) was a New Zealand boxer.

He won the bronze medal in the men's lightweight (57 – 60 kg) division at the 1950 British Empire Games.

References

1926 births
1986 deaths
Lightweight boxers
Boxers at the 1950 British Empire Games
Commonwealth Games bronze medallists for New Zealand
New Zealand male boxers
Commonwealth Games medallists in boxing
20th-century New Zealand people
Medallists at the 1950 British Empire Games